URB602 ([1,1'-biphenyl]-3-yl-carbamic acid, cyclohexyl ester) is a compound that has been found to inhibit hydrolysis of monoacyl glycerol compounds, such as 2-arachidonoylglycerol (2-AG) and 2-oleoylglycerol (2-OG). It was first described in 2003. A study  performed in 2005 found that the compound had specificity for metabolizing 2-AG over anandamide (another cannabinoid ligand) in rat brain presumably by inhibiting the enzyme monoacylglycerol lipase (MAGL), which is the primary metabolic enzyme of 2-AG. However, subsequent studies have shown that URB602 lacks specificity for MAGL inhibition in vitro.

References

Cannabinoids
Carbamates
Biphenyls
Cyclohexyl compounds